The 1983 Pioneer Life World Women's Curling Championship, the women's world curling championship, was held from April 3–9 at the Moose Jaw Civic Centre in Moose Jaw, Saskatchewan, Canada.

Teams

Round-robin standings

Round-robin results

Draw 1

Draw 2

Draw 3

Draw 4

Draw 5

Draw 6

Draw 7

Draw 8

Draw 9

Tiebreaker

Playoffs

Semifinals

Final

External links

World Women's Curling Championship
1983 in women's curling
Curling in Saskatchewan
Sport in Moose Jaw
1983 in Canadian curling
April 1983 sports events in Canada
1983 in Saskatchewan
Women's curling competitions in Canada
Sports competitions in Saskatchewan
1983 in Canadian women's sports